"The Secret Lives of the Nine Negro Teeth of George Washington" is a fantasy short story by P. Djèlí Clark, about George Washington's teeth. It was first published in Fireside Fiction in 2018.

Synopsis

Rather than being a single narrative, the story examines the lives of the nine enslaved people whose teeth were taken to produce dentures for George Washington — in a world where magic and sorcery are real.

Reception

"The Secret Lives of the Nine Negro Teeth of George Washington" won the Nebula Award for Best Short Story of 2018 and the 2019 Locus Award for Best Short Story, and was a finalist for both the 2019 Hugo Award for Best Short Story and the 2019 Theodore Sturgeon Memorial Award.

Locus noted that the story "defeats (the) idea that there might be 'one true' slave narrative, that slaves would have all been this way or that way", and observed that the story is "deeply inform(ed)" by Clark's training as a historian.

References

External links
Text of the story, at Fireside Fiction
On Slavery, Magic, and the Negro Teeth of George Washington, essay by Clark on the writing of the story

Cultural depictions of George Washington
Fantasy short stories
2018 short stories
Nebula Award for Best Short Story-winning works